Scaptius ditissima is a moth in the family Erebidae. It was described by Francis Walker in 1855. It is found in Panama, Brazil, Peru and Ecuador.

References

Moths described in 1855
Phaegopterina